Networks Party, officially REDES Party, is a Venezuelan political party, re-founded on August 20, 2012, by member of the United Socialist Party of Venezuela, Juan Barreto and Chavez leaders, collectives and workers. It was originally created in 2008 by Edita Pérez as an opposition party.
On July 10, 2020, the party announced it will participate in the 2020 Venezuelan parliamentary election in alliance with Soluciones para Venezuela Party.

References

2008 establishments in Venezuela
2012 establishments in Venezuela
Bolivarian Revolution
Political parties established in 2008
Political parties established in 2012
Political parties in Venezuela
Socialist parties in Venezuela